The following is a list of the winners of the World Women's Curling Championships since the inception of the championships in 1979.

Medallists

All-time medal table
As of 2022 World Championships

Performance timeline

See also
List of World Men's Curling Champions
List of World Mixed Doubles Curling Champions
List of Olympic medalists in curling
List of Paralympic medalists in wheelchair curling

Notes
Bronze medals were only awarded from 1985. Table shows third-place finishers before then.
1989–1994: Two bronze medals were awarded.

References

World Curling champions
Curling-related lists
World champions
Curling

de:Curling-Weltmeisterschaft#Weltmeisterschaften der Damen